Oit Ihuk is a temporary village in the Gu Achi district of the Papago Indian Reservation in Pima County, Arizona, United States. The name "Oit Ihuk" means "devil's claw field".

References

Populated places in Pima County, Arizona